This is a list of top Women's Division I college basketball teams ranked by the number of wins through the end of the 2021–22 season (minimum of 10 years as a Division I institution).

References

College women's basketball records and statistics in the United States
Women's sport-related lists